Aniek van Koot (born 15 August 1990) is a Dutch wheelchair tennis player who is a former world No. 1 in both singles and doubles.

Van Koot is a 23-time Grand Slam champion, having won the 2013 Australian Open, 2013 US Open and 2019 Wimbledon Championships in wheelchair singles. She has also won 17 major titles in doubles, variously partnering Florence Gravellier, Daniela di Toro, Jiske Griffioen and Diede de Groot. Van Koot has completed the calendar year Grand Slam in doubles on two occasions, in 2013 with Griffioen, and in 2019 alongside de Groot. She won the Wheelchair Tennis Masters in 2014 in singles, and in 2012, 2015 and 2018 in doubles. Van Koot has also won five Paralympic medals, gold in doubles at both Rio 2016 and Tokyo 2020, silver in singles at London 2012 and Rio 2016, and silver in doubles at London 2012.

Personal life
Aniek van Koot was born with her right leg shorter than her left. After a series of unsuccessful corrective operations van Koot had her right leg amputated. She started to play wheelchair tennis at the age of 10.

Career
In singles play van Koot was successful in Montreal. During the 2006 season van Koot won doubles titles in Livorno with Korie Homan, Jesolo with Sevenans. She finished third with Walraven at the 2006 Masters.

Van Koot won junior titles in Sydney and Nottingham during the 2007 season. She was also part of the Netherlands team that reached the Junior World Team cup final. In senior competition van Koot won a title in Gross Siegharts. Van Koot also made the finals of Hilton Head, Atlanta and Sardina. In doubles competitions she won in Jambes with Esther Vergeer. Won Austrian Open with Makke Smit. Sardinia. Van Koot reached the final of the French Open with Yaosa. With Yaosa finished last at the Masters. Finalist with Florence Gravellier at Pensacola and Nottingham.

During the 2008 season van Koot won one title in Prague. Van Koot reached the final of the singles competitions in Nottingham, Hilton Head, Jambes and Gross Siegharts. At the end of year Masters van Koot failed to advance from her group. In doubles competitions van Koot won titles in Christchurch and Sardinia with Jiske Griffioen. With Smit, van Koot added the Austrian Open doubles title before claiming the mixed doubles crown with Stefan Olsson.

2009–2012
During the 2009 season van Koot was a finalist in Boca Raton and Roland Garros. Van Koot won titles in Pensacola, Olot, Jambes and Prague. Van Koot finished 6th in the Masters. In doubles competitions van Koot won in Olot and Jambes. Playing with Jiske Griffioen at the Masters the pair reached the final.

The 2011 season saw van Koot win singles titles in Adelaide, Paris, Geneva, Jambes and Salzburg. reach the final in Boca Raton, Seoul and of the Masters. At the Grand Slams van Koot finished as the runner up in New York. Partnering Griffioen in the doubles events the pair won titles in Sydney, Pensacola, Boca Raton, Paris, Nottingham and St. Louis. The pair lost in the final of all four Grand Slams to Vergeer and Walraven, including from 5–2 up in the final set at Wimbledon and a 6–1 second set tiebreak lead at the US Open. Additionally the pair also lost in the final of the Japan Open and the Masters. Van Koot played doubles with other players as well, having success with Annick Sevenans in Geneva, Jambes and Salzburg. While with Marjolein Buis she won in Seoul. With Jordanne Whiley van Koot made the final of Sardinia.

During the 2012 season van Koot picked up singles titles in Cajan, Seoul and Paris. She was also the runner up in Sydney, Pensacola, Nottingham and the season ending Masters. Van Koot additionally picked up the silver medal at the Paralympic Games and was a finalist at Roland Garros and Melbourne. In doubles play van Koot played with Griffioen; the pair won titles in Cajan, Pensacola, Paris and Nottingham. They were also finalist in Boca Raton and Fukuoka. The pair also won their first Grand Slam as a team at Wimbledon and claimed the silver medal at the Paralympics. To finish the year the pair claimed their first Masters doubles title as a team. At the start of the year van Koot teamed up with Buis winning the title in Sydney and reaching the final of the first slam event of the year. Van Koot also represented her country in the World Team Cup, where she guided her country to win the competition for the 25 time.

2013–present

During the 2013 season van Koot won titles in Baton Rouge, Olot, and Jambes. Van Koot has made finals in Sydney, Melbourne, Nottingham and St Louis. At the Australian Open van Koot claimed her first Grand Slam singles title. Van Koot competed in the other Grand Slam events losing in the semi final of Roland Garros but winning the US Open. As a result of her success at the Australian Open and Esther Vergeer not playing, van Koot ascended to the world number one spot in the rankings. Van Koot lost the world number one spot to Sabine Ellerbrock in June after the French Open, but regained it following her success at the US Open. She held on to the position for the rest of the year and was named the 2013 ITF Wheelchair World Champion. With Jiske Griffioen, van Koot won the doubles title in Sydney and Nottingham. The pair won their first Australian, French and US Open titles and retained the Wimbledon crown to complete the Grand Slam. Their only defeat came in the final of St Louis, their first since the Paralympic final. Van Koot also won doubles titles with Buis in Baton Rouge, Helout partnered van Koot to the title in Olot and in Jambes she won with Sharon Walraven. When partnering Lucy Shuker, van Koot finished as the runner up in Paris. Van Koot's season was curtailed by injury ruling her out of the season ending Masters.

After missing the opening events of the 2014 season, van Koot dropped to world number two in the singles rankings, behind Ellerbrock after the Australian Open. Van Koot made her first appearance of the season in Bolton where she won the title. Throughout the rest of the season van Koot added titles in Pensacola and Johannesburg to her title in Bolton. As well she reached the singles final in Baton Rouge.

She competed at the 2016 Summer Paralympics, winning a silver medal in Women's Singles, and a gold medal in Women's Doubles.

Grand Slam performance timelines

Wheelchair singles

Wheelchair doubles

References

External links
 
 

1990 births
Living people
Dutch female tennis players
Wheelchair tennis players
Australian Open (tennis) champions
Wimbledon champions
Paralympic wheelchair tennis players of the Netherlands
Paralympic gold medalists for the Netherlands
Paralympic silver medalists for the Netherlands
Paralympic medalists in wheelchair tennis
Medalists at the 2012 Summer Paralympics
Medalists at the 2016 Summer Paralympics
Wheelchair tennis players at the 2012 Summer Paralympics
Wheelchair tennis players at the 2016 Summer Paralympics
Wheelchair tennis players at the 2020 Summer Paralympics
People from Winterswijk
Sportspeople from Gelderland
ITF World Champions
20th-century Dutch women
21st-century Dutch women